Trimayne Harris is a Belizean footballer who currently plays for Verdes in the Premier League of Belize and the Belize national team.

International career 
Harris made his national team debut for Belize on 23 March 2018 in a 4–2 win against Grenada.

References

External links
 

1997 births
Living people
Belizean footballers
Belize international footballers
Premier League of Belize players
Association football forwards
Belmopan Bandits players
Belize Defence Force FC players